MasterChef Junior is a Brazilian cooking competition television series based on the format of the U.K. series Junior MasterChef. The series premiered on Tuesday, October 20, 2015 at 10:30 p.m. (BRT / AMT) on Band.

Format
Children between the ages of 8 and 13 are eligible to apply for the series and two contestants are sent home per episode. The winner receives a R$20.000 cash prize, a trip for six to Disney World courtesy of Decolar.com, a 3-month cooking course with the three judges, a year's supply on Carrefour of R$1.000 per month, one small appliance kitchen package by Oster and the MasterChef Junior trophy.

Series overview

Season chronology

Ratings and reception

Criticism and controversy
During the premiere night, 12 year-old Valentina Schulz was subject of comments of sexual content on social media. The harassment around Valentina raised questions about underage exposure on TV, how to handle comments on social networks and how to explain to children subjects like pedophilia, bullying and many others.

The following day, Valentina's father told the press he did not allow his daughter to see this kind of feedback: "I had already named a person to take charge of her Twitter profile, because we were prepared for the harassment and the possible consequences, but we did not imagine finding freaks. Valentina has not been affected by that, since she only sees what we allow her to."

References

External links
 MasterChef Junior on Band.com

2015 Brazilian television seasons
2015 in Brazilian television
2015 Brazilian television series debuts
MasterChef Junior
Reality television spin-offs
Brazilian television series based on British television series
Brazilian reality television series
Brazilian cooking television series
Rede Bandeirantes original programming
Television series about children
Television series about teenagers